Fabrice Jau (born September 4, 1978 in Toulouse) is a French former professional footballer who played as a midfielder.

External links
 
 

1978 births
Living people
Association football midfielders
French footballers
Ligue 1 players
Ligue 2 players
Toulouse FC players
AS Saint-Étienne players
CS Sedan Ardennes players
SC Bastia players